This article details the qualifying phase for cycling at the 2024 Summer Olympics.  A total of 514 cyclists, with an equal distribution between men and women, will compete in twenty-two medal events across five disciplines (road, track, mountain biking, BMX racing, and BMX freestyle) at these Games.

Qualification summary

Timeline 
The following table outlines a timeline of the qualification events for cycling at the 2024 Summer Olympics.

Road cycling

A total of 180 cyclists (90 per gender) will race through the Paris 2024 course. Each NOC could enter a maximum of eight riders (four per gender) in road cycling with specific parameters: a maximum of four in the men's and women's road races and two in the men's and women's road time trial. The majority of the berths will be attributed to a specific number of riders per NOC based on the UCI Road World Ranking list by nations for the 2022–2023 season.

As the host country, France reserves a single men's and women's quota place in the road race. If one or two French cyclists qualify directly and regularly, their spare slots will be reallocated to the next highest-ranked eligible NOCs in the aforementioned events based on the national order of the UCI World Ranking list by 17 October 2023. The remainder of the total quota will be offered to the two highest-ranked NOCs (each composed of a single rider) vying for qualification at three of the continental meets (Africa, Asia, and the Americas) and at the 2023 UCI World Championships in Glasgow and its outlying areas across Scotland.

For the time trial, thirty-five spots per gender will be awarded to the NOCs ranked 1 to 25 from the UCI World Ranking list, respecting the minimum continental distribution, and the rest with only a single quota place each from the 2023 Worlds.

Men's road race

* Quota reduced by one to accommodate for the individual qualifiers

Men's individual time trial

** Qualified as a continental representative

Women's road race

* Quota reduced by one to accommodate for the individual qualifiers

Women's individual time trial

** Qualified as a continental representative

Track cycling

A total of 190 track cyclists, with an equal number of men and women, will race around the Paris 2024 velodrome. Each NOC could enter a maximum of fourteen track cyclists with a specific number of riders allotted per event: two per gender in sprint and keirin, a single rider each in the men's and women's omnium, a quartet of riders in the team pursuit, a trio in the team sprint, and a duo in the Madison race. All quota places offered in track cycling will be attributed based on the points obtained in the UCI Track Olympic Ranking period for the 2022 to 2024 season. The quota places per event are listed as follows:

 Team sprint – top 8 teams of three riders per gender
 Team pursuit – top 10 teams of four riders per gender
 Madison – all NOCs with a qualified team pursuit, apart from the next five highest-ranked quartets (a total of 15 teams)
 Omnium – NOCs directly qualifying for Madison, apart from the seven riders without a team (a total of 22 individuals)
 Sprint – NOCs qualifying in team sprint enter two individuals, apart from the next seven highest-ranked riders in the individual sprint and the next seven highest-ranked in keirin (a total of 30 individuals)
 Keirin – NOCs qualifying in team sprint enter two individuals, in addition to the next 7 best-ranked in the individual sprint, and the next seven highest-ranked in keirin (a total of 30 individuals)

Men's team sprint

Men's sprint

* Qualified as a continental representative

Men's keirin

* Qualified as a continental representative

Men's team pursuit

Men's Madison

Men's omnium

* Qualified as a continental representative

Women's team sprint

Women's sprint

* Qualified as a continental representative

Women's keirin

* Qualified as a continental representative

Women's team pursuit

Women's Madison

Women's omnium

* Qualified as a continental representative

Mountain biking

A total of 72 mountain bikers (36 per gender) will race through the Paris 2024 cross-country course, a slight reduction from those competing in Tokyo 2020 by four athletes. Each NOC could enter a maximum of four bikers (two per gender) in the men's and women's cross-country races. Host country France reserves one men's and women's quota place if unqualified, while two more spots are entitled to the eligible NOCs interested to have their mountain bikers compete for Paris 2024, as granted by the Universality principle. 

The majority of the berths will be awarded to the nineteen highest-ranked NOCs with a specific number of qualified bikers (a duo of riders for NOCs ranked 1 to 8 and a single rider for NOCs ranked 9 to 19) based on the points acquired throughout the biennial UCI Mountain Bike Olympic Qualification period (running from May 7, 2022, to May 26, 2024). Outside Europe and Oceania, the highest-ranked NOC per gender will secure a single quota place at the cross-country continental championships for Africa, Asia, and the Americas. The remaining four spots will be allocated to the top mountain bikers competing at the 2023 UCI World Championships in Glasgow and its outlying areas across Scotland, with two each in the elite and under-23, respectively.

Men's cross-country race

Women's cross-country race

BMX

BMX freestyle

Twenty-four quota places (12 per gender) are available to the BMX freestyle riders competing in Paris 2024, augmenting their roster size from the previous edition by six athletes. Each NOC could enter a maximum of two riders per gender in the men's and women's freestyle park. Host country France reserves one men's and women's quota place if unqualified. 

The initial half of the total quota will be distributed to the highest-ranked BMX freestyle riders (by name) through a four-month-long Olympic Qualifier Series (March to June 2024), while the remaining five spots per gender are offered to the highest-ranked NOCs competing at either the 2022 UCI Urban Cycling World Championships in Abu Dhabi, United Arab Emirates (two) or the 2023 UCI World Championships in Glasgow (three).

Men's freestyle

Women's freestyle

BMX racing

A total of 48 BMX riders (24 per gender) will race through the Paris 2024 course. Each NOC could enter a maximum of three spots per gender. Host country France reserves one men's and women's quota place if unqualified, while a further spot is entitled to the eligible NOCs interested to have their BMX racers compete for Paris 2024, as granted by the Universality principle. 

The remainder of the total quota will be allocated to the eligible NOCs across four qualification routes. Seventeen of them with a specific number of qualified riders (a trio for the top two NOCs, a duo for NOCs ranked 3 to 5, and a single rider for NOCs ranked 6 to 10) will receive a coveted spot based on the points accumulated throughout the biennial UCI BMX Olympic Qualification period (running from August 1, 2022, to June 4, 2024). Outside Europe and Oceania, the highest-ranked NOC per gender will secure a single quota place at the BMX continental championships for Africa, Asia, and the Americas. The remaining four spots will be allocated to the top BMX riders competing at the 2023 UCI World Championships in Glasgow and at the 2024 Worlds in Rock Hill, South Carolina.

Men's race

** Qualified as a continental representative

Women's race

** Qualified as a continental representative

References

Qualification for the 2024 Summer Olympics
Cycling qualification for the Summer Olympics
Qualification